N'Goloblasso (also spelled Ngoloblaso) is a town in north-western Ivory Coast. It is a sub-prefecture of Madinani Department in Kabadougou Region, Denguélé District.

N'Goloblasso was a commune until March 2012, when it became one of 1126 communes nationwide that were abolished.

In 2014, the population of the sub-prefecture of N'Goloblasso was 8,721.

Villages
The 6 villages of the sub-prefecture of N'Goloblasso and their population in 2014 are

 Koroumba  (2 024)
 Bouroumasso  (802)
 Karasso  (1 206)
 N'goloblasso  (2 330)
 Séguébé  (550)
 Zéguétiéla  (1 809)

References

Sub-prefectures of Kabadougou
Former communes of Ivory Coast